A Taste of Romance is a 2012 Hallmark Channel original movie directed by Lee Rose from a screenplay by Jennifer Notas.

Plot
Uptight French chef Sara Westbrook (Teri Polo) gets fired up when her upscale café, Chez Varenne, is suddenly overshadowed by a new restaurant moving in next door run by a group of rowdy firemen. Led by handsome former fire fighter Gill Callahan (James Patrick Stuart) and his friend Danny (Rockmond Dunbar), The Five Alarm Grill is soon a big success while Sara and Patsy (Romy Rosemont), her pastry chef, struggle to bring in customers.

Sara suddenly softens when she meets Gill's ten-year-old daughter Hannah (Bailee Madison) who she can't help but take under her wing when she learns Hannah is growing up without a mom. Ignoring the obvious tension between her dad and Sara, Hannah is soon playing matchmaker. As Gill and Sara slowly begin to stir up romance, their relationship is tested once again when a local food critic gets in the mix. Can the couple resist the temptation to compete with each other, or will the heat of competition drive them apart?

Cast
 Teri Polo as Sara Westbrook
 James Patrick Stuart as Gill Callahan
 Alexander Bedria as Officer Ramirez
 Jack Conley as Chief
 Ashley Cusato as Jane
 Rockmond Dunbar as Danny Marsh
 Peggy Dunne as Customer #2
 Dana Foist as Customer #4
 Bailee Madison as Hannah Callahan
 Mercy Malick as News Producer
 Simone Missick as Elise (credited as Simone Cook)
 Jonathan Nail as Customer #1
 Veronica Parks as Hot Date
 Amy Cale Peterson as Customer #3
 Derek Ray as Michael
 Romy Rosemont as Patsy Danvers
 Erica Shaffer as Nora Smithson

Reception 
A Taste of Romance was the #1 movie of the week among its key demographic, women aged 23–54, as well as the #1 household rated ad-supported cable movie of the week.

Critic Francine Brokaw described A Taste of Romance as "a sweet tale of love (pun intended)" with "interesting characters and a cute plot". She had particular praise for the performance of young Bailee Madison.

The Dove Foundation in its review of the film said, "We are proud to award the film the Dove “Family-Approved” Seal for all ages."

References

External links 
 

2012 television films
2012 films
Hallmark Channel original films
Films directed by Lee Rose (director)